The forty-third season of the NBC comedy series Saturday Night Live premiered on September 30, 2017, during the 2017–2018 television season with host Ryan Gosling and musical guest Jay-Z, and concluded on May 19, 2018, with host Tina Fey and musical guest Nicki Minaj. Like the final four episodes of season 42, season 43 was broadcast live in all four time zones within the contiguous United States, with the exception of the Natalie Portman/Dua Lipa episode due to the network's commitment to the NFL.

Cast
Prior to the start of the season, longtime cast members Bobby Moynihan, Vanessa Bayer, and Sasheer Zamata left the show after spending their respective nine, seven, and four seasons on the show. Following Moynihan, Bayer, and Zamata's departures, the show hired three new featured players: comedian and writer Heidi Gardner of The Groundlings, iO Chicago alum Luke Null, and stand-up comedian Chris Redd, who previously did sketch comedy at Second City. Redd had been incorrectly reported as joining the cast during the previous season. 

Mikey Day, Alex Moffat, and Melissa Villaseñor continued as featured players until they upgraded to repertory status in the following season.

With this announcement came the confirmation that the rest of the cast from the previous season would return, including guest star Alec Baldwin in his role as President Donald Trump. 

With his return, Kenan Thompson surpassed Darrell Hammond's record as the longest-tenured cast member in the show's history, with a total of fifteen seasons compared to Darrell Hammond's fourteen seasons from 1995-2009.

This is the only season for Luke Null, who was let go after the season's end.

Cast roster

Repertory Players
 Beck Bennett
 Aidy Bryant
 Michael Che
 Pete Davidson
 Leslie Jones
 Colin Jost
 Kate McKinnon
 Kyle Mooney
 Cecily Strong
 Kenan Thompson

Featured Players
 Mikey Day
 Heidi Gardner
 Alex Moffat
 Luke Null
 Chris Redd
 Melissa Villaseñor

bold denotes "Weekend Update" anchor

Crew

Writers

Prior to the start of the season, the show added Steven Castillo, Andrew Dismukes, Claire Friedman, Sam Jay, Erik Marino, Nimesh Patel, and Gary Richardson to the writing staff. Also prior to the season, head writers Chris Kelly and Sarah Schneider departed the show. On December 12, 2017, Jost and Che were named co-head writers, making Che the first African American head writer. Jost was previously the head writer for 3 years from 2012 to 2015.

Episodes

Specials

Notes

References

43
Saturday Night Live in the 2010s
2017 American television seasons
2018 American television seasons
Television shows directed by Don Roy King